Patrick Mayer may refer to:

 Patrick Mayer (Austrian footballer) (born 1986)
 Patrick Mayer (German footballer) (born 1988)
 Pat Mayer (born 1961), ice hockey player

See also 
 Patrick Meyer (disambiguation)